Father André Prost (born August 28, 1903 in Orgelet, Jura; died May 24, 1987 in Bry-sur-Marne) was a French missionary, Africanist, and linguist.

As a White Father, he was a member of the Société des africanistes since 1932, and was a founding member of the Société des linguistes de l'Afrique occidentale (SLAO).

He authored some fifty books and articles on the languages of West Africa.

References

External links
Publications on Persée

1903 births
1987 deaths
Linguists from France
Linguists of Niger–Congo languages
Missionary linguists
White Fathers
French Africanists
20th-century linguists